"Vincent" is a song by Don McLean, written as a tribute to Vincent van Gogh. It is often erroneously titled after its opening refrain, "Starry, Starry Night", a reference to Van Gogh's 1889 painting The Starry Night.

McLean wrote the lyrics in 1971 after reading a book about the life of Van Gogh. It was released on McLean's 1971 American Pie album; the following year, the song topped the UK Singles Chart for two weeks, and peaked at No. 12 in the United States, where it also hit No. 2 on the Easy Listening chart. Billboard ranked it as the No. 94 song for 1972.

The song makes use mainly of the guitar, but also includes the accordion, marimba, and strings.

In July 2020, the original handwritten lyrics went up for sale for $1.5 million.

Background
McLean said the following about the genesis of the song:

Critical reception
The Telegraph wrote: "With its bittersweet palette of major and minor chords, "Vincent"'s soothing melody is one of high emotion recollected in tranquillity". AllMusic retrospectively described the song as "McLean's paean to Van Gogh ... sympathiz[ing] with Van Gogh's suicide as a sane comment on an insane world." The site also said McLean performs "a particularly poignant rendition" of "Vincent" on the 2001 live album Starry, Starry Night.

The song was a particular favorite of the rapper and actor Tupac Shakur, and was played to him at the University Medical Center of Southern Nevada, the hospital that he was admitted to just before he died of gunshot wounds from a drive-by shooting.

Charts

Weekly charts

Year-end charts

Certifications

Notable cover versions
Jane Olivor recorded the song for her 1976 album release First Night.

In 1996, a punk rock cover by NOFX was published on the compilation album Survival of the Fattest by the record label Fat Wreck Cords.

Rick Astley released a cover version on his 2005 album Portrait.

Marina Prior recorded the song for her 2012 album Both Sides Now.

Lianne La Havas recorded a cover for the soundtrack album and credits of the 2017 film Loving Vincent.

In December 2017, James Blake performed a live piano-backed cover at Conway Studios, Los Angeles.

Ellie Goulding released a cover of the song on Valentine's Day 2018, apologizing to her fans about delays in her recording projects. McLean tweeted Goulding, saying "'Vincent' is not an easy song to sing and you sing it very beautifully." She included her cover in her 2020 Songbook for Christmas EP.

In December 2018, Jasmine Thompson and Ryan Keen performed a duet cover for their YouTube channel.

References

External links
 

Don McLean songs
UK Singles Chart number-one singles
Irish Singles Chart number-one singles
Number-one singles in Italy
1972 songs
1972 singles
United Artists Records singles
Works about Vincent van Gogh
Rock ballads
Folk ballads
1970s ballads
NOFX songs
Songs written by Don McLean
Songs about painters